Jose "Jojo" Vidanes is an American sport shooter from California who won the overall 2008 IPSC Handgun World Shoot Modified division title. He also has a senior category gold medal in Open division from the 2017 Rifle World Shoot, and a senior category silver medal from the 2018 Shotgun World Shoot.

Jojo started competing actively around 1990, and already won a number of regional IPSC championships in 1993 and 1994.

See also 
 Jerry Miculek, American sport shooter

References

External links 
 Jojo Vidanes | 2018 IPSC Shotgun World Shoot (Châteauroux, France) - YouTube

Year of birth missing (living people)
Living people
IPSC shooters
American male sport shooters
Place of birth missing (living people)
21st-century American people